Joseph P. McHugh (April 30, 1904 – January 31, 1993) was an American ring announcer. He announced boxing and wrestling matches in Allentown, Pennsylvania from the 1920s through the 1980s and gained national exposure on WWWF/WWF programming in the 70s and 80s.

Early life
McHugh was born on April 30, 1904 in Allentown, Pennsylvania. He was one of six sons born to Owen E. and Bridget (Brown) McHugh. One of his brothers was Terry McHugh, a boxer who fought bantamweight champion Pete Herman in 1919. He grew up on Gordon Street in the Irish section of Allentown's Sixth Ward  and graduated from Allentown Central Catholic High School.

Early career
When he was 16 years old, McHugh went into vaudeville. He performed across the United States as a comedian and an emcee. After vaudeville, McHugh worked as an entertainment promoter in Lehigh Valley clubs. He was part owner of Club Rio, a nightclub located in South Whitehall Township. He also worked as a sales associate for Roy Eichelberger Roofing and Siding in Allentown until 1976.  McHugh was married to Barbara M. Gorman. They had one daughter, also named Barbara. During World War II, McHugh served in the United States Army.

Ring announcing
By 1929, McHugh was a licensed ring announcer. He announced boxing and wrestling matches primarily in the Allentown area during the city's heyday as a fight town as well as other arenas along the east coast. He announced fights featuring a number of notable boxers, including Rocky Marciano, Larry Holmes, Muhammad Ali, and Jack Sharkey. In 1977, Sports Illustrated described McHugh as a "Living Legend of the Ring".

In 1964, McHugh began announcing World Wide Wrestling Federation matches in Allentown. In 1977, the WWWF (later known as the WWF) began holding television tapings at the Allentown Fairgrounds's Agricultural Hall, which gave McHugh nationwide exposure. The WWF stopped taping in Allentown in 1984, but McHugh continued to announce regional wrestling shows until his death on January 31, 1993.  He would sometimes get applauded when he wrapped up his introductory spiel identifying various persons involved in the proceedings by saying "And my name is Joooooooooe McHugh!"

References

1904 births
1993 deaths
Allentown Central Catholic High School alumni
Boxing people
American people of Irish descent
Nightclub owners
Sportspeople from Allentown, Pennsylvania
Professional wrestling announcers
United States Army personnel of World War II
Vaudeville performers